
A terrestrial cable is a communications cable which crosses land, rather than water. Terrestrial cable may be subterranean (buried) or aerial (suspended from poles), and may be fiber or copper. The term "terrestrial cable" is principally used to distinguish it from submarine cable, although some overlap exists between the two.

Major terrestrial cable systems include the Europe-Persia Express Gateway and the family of Eurasia terrestrial cable networks.

See also 
 Aerial cable
 Utility pole
 Undergrounding
 Direct-buried cable
 List of terrestrial fibre optic cable projects in Africa

References

External links 
 Eurasia terrestrial cable networks
 The Operation of Cross-Border Terrestrial Fibre-Optic Networks in Asia and the Pacific

Signal cables
Optical telecommunications cables
Telecommunications equipment
History of telecommunications